Lux Channel I Superstar, is a Bangladeshi television reality show that airs on Channel I. The Show is similar to America's Next Top Model. Lux Channel i Superstar contest is the largest event in Bangladesh to hunt beautiful women who can build career as actress, singer and model. The prestigious beauty pageant champion get the chance to be the "Bangladesh Face of Lux" and is awarded a brand new car and Tk. 10 lakh. The first runner-up award is Tk. 5 lakh while the second runner-up gets Tk. 3 lakh. The competition is held by a joint effort of Channel i and Unilever Bangladesh Limited. The competition was launched in 2005. In 2011, it was not held.

Format
The road to being the Lux Channel I Superstar is not easy. More than 10,000 girls around Bangladesh apply every year and the initial auditions are very competitive due to the large number of applicants. Once the lucky few are chosen, they are sent to live for 3 months in a “Boot camp” where various training programmes are held every day. Each season of Lux Channel I Superstar consists of 8-10 episodes and starts with 20 contestants. The contestants are judged weekly on their overall appearance, participation in challenges, and best shot from that week's photo shoot; Every week, single or multiple contestants are eliminated, though in some rare cases no elimination was given by the judging panel. Many big fashion brands are associated with the show as either costume or makeup partners.

Host and judges

Winners and runners-up

See also
Closeup1

References

2010s Bangladeshi television series
Bangladeshi music television shows
Bangladeshi reality television series
Bengali-language television programming in Bangladesh
Channel i original programming